Asawa Ko, Karibal Ko (international title: Silent Shadow /  My Spouse, My Rival) is a 2018 Philippine drama television series starring Kris Bernal, Rayver Cruz and Thea Tolentino. The series premiered on GMA Network's GMA Afternoon Prime and Sabado Star Power sa Hapon block and worldwide via GMA Pinoy TV from October 22, 2018 to March 2, 2019, replacing The Stepdaughters, which aired on Ika-5 Utos timeslot.

NUTAM (Nationwide Urban Television Audience Measurement) People in Television Homes ratings are provided by AGB Nielsen Philippines. The series ended, but its the 19th-week run, and with a total of 114 episodes. It was replaced by Dragon Lady.

Series overview

Episodes

October 2018

November 2018

December 2018

January 2019

February 2019

March 2019

References

Lists of Philippine drama television series episodes